The International Conference on Low Temperature Physics (LT) is an academic conference held every three years near the month of September attracting on average well over a thousand participants from all over the world. The LT conferences are endorsed by the International Union of Pure and Applied Physics (IUPAP) via its Commission on Low Temperature Physics (C5). The mandate of the LT conferences is to promote the exchange of information and views among the members of the international scientific community in the general field of Low Temperature Physics.

Usually, several other satellite meetings are also held just before or after the LT conferences in neighboring cities such as the International Conference on Ultra Low Temperature Physics series (ULT) as well as other meetings related to the topics listed below. Starting from 1998, the Symposium on Quantum Fluids and Solids (QFT) conference series was decided to be held in all non-LT years.

Topics 
The general field of low temperature physics is broad, but usually the LT conferences are divided into five parallel programs:

A. Quantum Gases, Fluids and Solids
B. Superconductivity
C. Quantum Phase Transitions and Magnetism
D. Electronic Quantum Transport in Condensed Matter
E. Cryogenic Techniques and Applications

Prizes 
The LT conferences traditionally hand out the following prizes during their opening sessions:

 The Fritz London Memorial Prize
 The Simon Memorial Prize
 The IUPAP Young Scientist Prizes in Low Temperature Physics (since LT-25)

Editions 
As of late, the conferences are being held in the following pattern: Europe -> Asia -> The Americas -> Europe.

References 

Physics conferences